Yellow is the seventh studio album by Nigerian singer Brymo, released independently on April 1, 2020. It serves as the follow-up to his live album Live! at Terra Kulture Arena (2019). Yellow was crafted from hedonism, and is a departure from the dark themes deployed on Oṣó. Described by Brymo as an album about "love and survival", Yellow is an alternative pop and electronic record that incorporates elements of sentimental ballad, trap, sophisti-pop, shoegaze, rock, synth-pop and folk. Nigerian singer Lindsey Abudei is the only artist featured on the album. Yellow was initially meant to comprise 17 songs but due to technical issues, two songs were omitted from the project. The album was supported by the single "Strippers + White Lines".

Background
Yellow was crafted from hedonism, and is a departure from the dark themes deployed on Oṣó. Brymo began recording the album in April 2018 and completed it within a 16-month period. He said he recorded Yellow after becoming a different person from who he used to be. Brymo unveiled the album's cover art and track list in March 2020. He described Yellow as an album about "love and survival" and said it would be an alternative pop and electronic record. The album incorporates elements of sentimental ballad, trap, sophisti-pop, shoegaze, rock, synth-pop and folk. Its cover art features a rendition of Insight and Frustrations 2020, a painting by Nigerian artist Samuel Olowomeye Ancestor. Ancestor's melancholic painting depicts an eerie half-faced female with a lit cigar to her mouth. Brymo revealed on Instagram that he was drawn to the painting after having several conversations with his friends.

With the exception of "Abụ Ya", which was co-produced by Nsikak David and Lindsey Abudei, all of the remaining tracks on Yellow were produced and engineered entirely by Brymo's frequent collaborator Mikky Me Joses. Thematically, the album explores topics such as love, heartbreak, socio-politics, mental health, betrayal and ego. Yellow spans three sides and was initially composed of 17 tracks: six were recorded in English, five in Nigerian Pidgin, five in Yoruba and one in Igbo. The album's three sides were numbered in Arabic, Roman and English numerals, respectively. On March 24, Brymo cited technical reasons for omitting the tracks "Iya Awele" and "Ife" from the album.

Composition
On the album's opener "Espirit De Corps", Brymo examines the socio-politics of a decaying society; the song's production features a trap beat. In "Blackmail", he addresses the risks that emotional blackmail presents to relationships; the song contains drums and guitar solos commonly used in smooth jazz and soft rock. In "Ozymandias", Brymo sings about a man who takes all the love of a woman without reciprocating any back; the song is a tale of self-criticism and self-awareness. In the baroque pop track "Heartbreak Songs are Better in English", he sings about his desires to express his heartbreak emotively despite his society's impediment against it. The sentimental ballad "Strippers + White Lines" is symbolic of mental slavery. In the ballad "Without You", Brymo sings about the problematic relationship between a man and a woman who refuse to live without each other despite acknowledging each other's flaws.

The neo-soul track "Woman" is dedicated to Brymo's unnamed partner; the song contains drums and a bass riff. In "Black Man, Black Woman", Brymo discusses the pros and cons of gender roles and social norms. The pop-infused soul and blues track "Gambu" depicts the love a woman has for an imperfect man with a reputation. "Rara Rira" is an alternative pop song with a folk percussion; it describes carefree people who enjoy life and live on the edge. The pop song "Brain Gain", which is reminiscent of songs by Gabriella Cilmi and Duffy, features a trumpet solo and addresses topics such as immigration. "Ọ̀run n Móoru" (Yoruba: "Heaven is Heated") is a ballad that criticizes gossip among chiefs and kings. In "A F'èédú Fan'ná", Brymo makes references to his grandmother and implants a proverbial fire in listeners' minds. The acoustic track "Abụ Ya" (which translates to "his/her hymn") exposes Brymo and his love interest's tumultuous relationship.

Singles
The album's lead single "Strippers + White Lines" was released on April 1, 2020. The track was produced by Mikky Me Joses and is a mixture of R&B, alternative music and sentimental ballad. "Strippers + White Lines" discusses life's struggles, depression and hope. The accompanying music video for the song was shot and directed by Promise Charles for In Touch Films.

Critical reception

Yellow received positive critical acclaim from music critics. Pulse Nigeria's Motolani Alake awarded the album 9.7 stars out of 10, commending Brymo for using "symbolism and metaphor to breakdown his topics". Alake also notes the album is "built on resonant topics cut from the larger society". Music journalist Oris Aigbokhaevbolo granted the album an A rating, praising its lyrics and Brymo's songwriting. Reviewing for BellaNaija, Notiki Bello called the album "robust and rigorous" and characterized it as a "well-written book of fiction that is sung without the tedious effort of thumbing through hundreds of pages". Iyke Bede of This Day newspaper commended Yellow for being "a testament of years of continued honing of craft and sheer consistency, and not just another album". Bede also said the album's tracks can "fit snugly into any of Brymo's past albums without one noticing any seismic shift in sound".

The Nigerian Tribune writer Kola Muhammed praised Brymo's bilingual approach and commended him for "swathing his message with wit and metaphysical conceits". In a less enthusiastic review, music critic Dami Ajayi said Yellow "pales behind his last three studio albums" despite it "pushing his craft in new directions"; Ajayi was also critical of side A. Toni Kan echoed  similar sentiments made by Ajayi and criticized Brymo for "producing an album with something for everyone".

Track listing

Personnel
Credits adapted from the album's back cover.
Ọlawale Ọlọfọrọ – primary artist, writer, performer
Lindsey Abudei – featured artist, writer, production 
Mikky Me Joses – production, engineering 
Nsikak David – production 
Lanre Lawal – A&R

Release history

References

2020 albums
Brymo albums
Yoruba-language albums
Igbo-language albums
Albums produced by Lindsey Abudei